The 2017–18 Pro Basketball League, for sponsorship reasons the EuroMillions Basketball League, was the 91st season of the Belgian Basketball League, first tier of basketball in Belgium. The defending champion was Oostende. The season started on 23 September 2017 and ended 14 June 2018.

Teams
Antwerp Giants changed its name to Telenet Giants Antwerp, following a sponsorship agreement with Telenet.Telenet komende drie jaar hoofdsponsor van Antwerp Giants Meanwhile, Telenet left Oostende which meant the sponsored club name disappeared after seven years.

Arenas and locations

Personnel and kits

Managerial changes

Regular season
In the regular season, teams play against each other home-and-away in a round-robin format. The eight highest placed teams advance to the playoffs. The first games are played on 23 September 2017 and the regular season finishes on 20 May 2018.

Standings

Playoffs
The playoffs start on 26 May and end on 13, 15 or 17 June 2017. The winner of the playoffs is crowned Belgian national champion. In the quarterfinals and semifinals a best-of-three format is used, while the finals are played in a best-of-five format. The higher seeded team had home advantage and played games one, three and five (if possible) at home. Small bold numbers indicate team seeding.

Bracket

Quarterfinals

|}

Semifinals

|}

Finals

|}

Final standings

Awards

Individual honours

All-League Teams

In European competitions

References

Basketball League Belgium Division I seasons
Belgian
Lea